Just for Fun is the third studio album and second major label album by American pop band Timeflies. It was released on September 18, 2015 through Island Records. A buzz single for the album, "NSFW" (featuring Angel Haze), was released in February 2015, but the song was cut from the album's final track list. It was followed by the album's official lead single "Worse Things Than Love" (featuring Natalie La Rose) on June 23, 2015. Prior to the album's release, "Undress Rehearsal" and "Stuck with Me" were released as promotional singles. "Guilty" was released as the album's second single with its music video premiering on 1 September 2015; "Crazy" was the third single and its video debuted on September 15. Timeflies promoted the album with The Just for Fun Tour, running from October to November 2015.

Track listing

Charts

References

2015 albums
Timeflies albums
Island Records albums